Oh Inhuman Spectacle is the debut studio album by Australian band Methyl Ethel. It was released in June 2015 through Dot Dash/4AD.

Reception

In a review by Stuart Berman from Pitchfork, Berman said "Methyl Ethel makes dream-pop for insomniacs—shadowy, nocturnal music whose surface shimmer barely conceals the fidgety, restless soul lurking underneath."

Bekki Bemrose from Drowned in Sound said "The first few tracks on Oh Inhuman Spectacle set a high bar not quite maintained throughout, but still, the record is a promising début and a perfect soundtrack for those mysterious twilight hours."

Harriet Gibsone from The Guardian said "Its opening handful of tracks are robust – the doomish disco of 'Idée Fixe', the crepuscular melancholy of 'Shadowboxing', the Johnny Marr guitars that inhabit 'Rogues' – but soon the record wears out. Although it assimilates the past decade of alt-pop, there's a wiry quality to Webb's voice which recalls Turin Brakes' 'Olly Knights'. Much of the music here is less unearthly obscurity and more relatively straightforward indie, dressed up in a rainbow poncho."

Track listing

Release history

References

2015 debut albums
Methyl Ethel albums
Dot Dash Recordings albums
4AD albums